The Beauport Harfangs (Snow Owls) were a junior ice hockey team in the Quebec Major Junior Hockey League (QMJHL) from 1990 to 1997. The team played its home games at the Aréna Marcel-Bédard in the Quebec City suburb of Beauport. The team's first coach was Alain Chainey, who had previously been an assistant coach with the National Hockey League (NHL)'s Quebec Nordiques. The Harfangs played for seven seasons before relocating to Quebec City in 1997 to become the second incarnation of the Quebec Remparts.

Coaches
Jos Canale coached the Harfangs for two and a half seasons from 1993 to 1995. Alain Vigneault, who coached the Harfangs in the team's final two seasons, guided them to the QMJHL finals in 1995-96. Vigneault has since gone on to serve as a head coach in the NHL. Jocelyn "Joe" Hardy, who coached the Harfangs during part of the 1992–93 season, also played briefly in the NHL, and was a local sportsman.

NHL alumni
Nineteen players graduated to play in the NHL.

External links
 Season-by-season results
 All-time roster
 List of NHL alumni

Defunct Quebec Major Junior Hockey League teams
1990 establishments in Quebec
1997 disestablishments in Quebec
Ice hockey clubs established in 1990
Sports clubs disestablished in 1997